Fly-by-Night (also known under the alternative title Secrets of G32) is a 1942 American thriller/screwball comedy film directed by Robert Siodmak, starring Richard Carlson and Nancy Kelly. It was Siodmak's second American film. The film finds a young doctor tracking down a Nazi spy ring in an effort to clear his name after being charged with the murder of a scientist.

Cast
Richard Carlson as Dr. Geoffrey Burton
Nancy Kelly as Pat Lindsey
Albert Bassermann as Dr. Storm
Miles Mander as Professor Langner
Edward Gargan as Officer Charlie Prescott
Adrian Morris as Officer John Prescott
Martin Kosleck as George Taylor
Walter Kingsford as Heydt 
Cy Kendall as Dahlig
Nestor Paiva as Grube
Oscar O'Shea as Pa Prescott
Mary Gordon as Ma Prescott
Arthur Loft as Inspector Karns
Marion Martin as Blond nurse
Clem Bevans as Train station watchman

References

External links
IMDB profile

Fly by Night (1942) - filmaffinity

1942 films
Films directed by Robert Siodmak
1940s thriller films
American thriller films
1940s English-language films
American black-and-white films
Paramount Pictures films
Films produced by Sol C. Siegel
Films with screenplays by F. Hugh Herbert
1940s American films